Olive Branch was launched in 1775 in Philadelphia. From at least 1776 on she sailed as a West Indiaman from Great Britain. In 1791 she sailed as a whaler to the British Southern Whale Fishery, but was lost in August, early in the outbound leg of her voyage.

Career
Olive Branch first appeared in Lloyd's Register (LR) in 1776. 

On 11 April 1791 Olive Branch, Lucas, master, sailed from the Downs, bound for the South Seas. She was reported in November to have been at the Isle of Man on 22 May.

Fate
In January 1792 Lloyd's List reported that Olive Branch, Lucas, master, had been lost off the coast of Patagonia. She had been lost off Puerto Deseado in August 1791; some of the crew made it to Montevideo in a boat on 28 December 1791.

By one report the Spanish Compania Maritima purchased Olive Branch. LR continued to carry Olive Branch for some years after 1791, but with unchanged data.

Captain Lucas survived.

Citations

References
 

1775 ships
Ships built in Philadelphia
Age of Sail merchant ships of England
Whaling ships
Maritime incidents in 1791